The  is one of nine active divisions of the Japan Ground Self-Defense Force. The division is the only armored division of the Japan Ground Self-Defense Force. It is subordinated to the Northern Army and is headquartered in Chitose, Hokkaidō. Its responsibility is the defense of North Hokkaidō against potential conflicts, mostly from Russia.

The division was raised on 15 August 1962 as the 7th Mechanized Division. In 1981 it was merged with the 1st Armor Brigade to become the 7th Armored Division. As of 1987 it consisted of a headquarters, headquarters company, 7 regiments (3 armor, 1 motorized infantry, 1 artillery, 1 air defense artillery and 1 logistical support regiment), and 3 battalions (namely Reconnaissance, Combat Engineer, and Signals).

An armor regiment consisted of 5 tank squadrons, each with 15 Type 90 tanks (75 in all). A motorized infantry regiment had 6 motorized infantry companies and 1 mortar company. The artillery regiment contained 4 155-mm self-propelled howitzer battalions (10 guns in each).

In all, the armored division had about 6,500 men, 230 tanks, about 350 Type 89 and Type 73 armored personnel carriers, 40 self-propelled howitzers, 48 mortars (81-mm and larger), 12 106-mm recoilless weapons, 40 35- and 40-mm self-propelled air defense systems, along with other armament and support systems, making it the most well-armed Japanese division.

Organization 

7th Division consists of a division headquarters, three tank regiments, one mechanized infantry regiment, one mechanized artillery regiment, one air defense regiment, one logistics support regiment and other support and service battalions and companies. In the field, the division task organizes these elements into combined arms "combat teams". For example, attaching an infantry company, artillery battery, air defense battery and service units to a tank regiment to form a Tank Combat Team.
 7th Division, at Camp Higashi Chitose in Chitose
 7th Division HQ, in Chitose
 71st Tank Regiment, in Chitose, with four Type 90 Main Battle Tank, and one Type 10 Main Battle Tank squadron
 72nd Tank Regiment, in Eniwa, with five Type 90 Main Battle Tank squadrons
 73rd Tank Regiment, in Eniwa, with five Type 90 Main Battle Tank squadrons
 11th Mechanized Infantry Regiment, in Chitose, with three Type 89 Infantry Fighting Vehicle, three Type 73 Armored Personnel Carrier, and one Type 96 120mm Self-Propelled Mortar Carrier company
 7th Artillery Regiment (Mechanized), in Chitose
 1st Artillery Battalion, with two batteries of Type 99 155mm Self-propelled howitzers
 2nd Artillery Battalion, with two batteries of Type 99 155mm Self-propelled howitzers
 3rd Artillery Battalion, with two batteries of Type 99 155mm Self-propelled howitzers
 4th Artillery Battalion, with two batteries of Type 99 155mm Self-propelled howitzers
 7th Anti-Aircraft Artillery Regiment, in Shinhidaka, with two Type 81 Surface-to-air missile systems and four Type 87 self-propelled anti-aircraft guns batteries
 7th Engineer Battalion (Combat), in Chitose
 7th Signal Battalion, in Chitose
 7th Reconnaissance Company, in Chitose, with Type 87 armored reconnaissance vehicles
 7th Aviation Squadron, at Chitose Airport, flying UH-1J and OH-6D helicopters
 7th NBC Protection Company, in Chitose
 7th Logistic Support Regiment, in Chitose
 1st Maintenance Battalion
 2nd Maintenance Battalion
 Supply Company
 Medical Company
 Transport Company
 7th Division Band

References

External links 
 Homepage 7th Division (Japanese)

Japan Ground Self-Defense Force Division
Military units and formations established in 1962